The North Ghent Historic District is a national historic district located at Norfolk, Virginia. It encompasses 322 contributing buildings in a primarily residential section of Norfolk. It developed primarily between 1897 and 1912 as a northward extension of
Ghent.  The neighborhood includes notable examples of a variety of architectural styles including the Greek Revival and Queen Anne styles.  Notable non-residential buildings include the First Presbyterian Church, Ohef Sholom Temple, and Ghent Methodist Church (1921).  Located in the district is the separately listed Christ and St. Luke's Church.

It was listed on the National Register of Historic Places in 2001.

References

Houses on the National Register of Historic Places in Virginia
Historic districts on the National Register of Historic Places in Virginia
National Register of Historic Places in Norfolk, Virginia
Greek Revival architecture in Virginia
Queen Anne architecture in Virginia
Neighborhoods in Norfolk, Virginia
Houses in Norfolk, Virginia